Morcín is a municipality in the Autonomous Community of the Principality of Asturias, Spain. It is bordered on the north by Santo Adriano and Ribera de Arriba, on the east by Ribera and Mieres, on the south by Riosa on the west by Quirós.

Parishes
Argame
La Foz
La Piñera
Peñerudes
San Esteban
San Sebastián
Santa Eulalia

Twin towns
 Arroyo Naranjo, Cuba
 Bir Enzaran, Western Sahara
 Lécousse, France

Gallery

References

External links
Federación Asturiana de Concejos 

Municipalities in Asturias